Luda Kamchiya is a river in eastern Bulgaria, the main tributary of the Kamchiya river. The river has a total length of 180 km and a drainage basin of 1610 km2, with an average slope of 5.3‰.

Luda Kamchiya rises from the Balkan Mountains in the area of Sliven, then flows between two arms of the mountains before crossing through the Luda Kamchiya Gorge and flowing into northern Bulgaria, joining Golyama Kamchiya near Dalgopol to form the Kamchiya river.

The river valley provides an important route between Northern and Southern Bulgaria, with a major railway line following the course of the river. There are also two significant reservoirs build on Luda Kamchiya: Kamchiya and Tsonevo.

References

Rivers of Bulgaria
Landforms of Sliven Province
Landforms of Varna Province
Landforms of Burgas Province